Peg Norman (born 1964 in Gambo, Newfoundland) is a Canadian documentary filmmaker, best known for her role in the film My Left Breast, which documented her partner Gerry Rogers' battle with breast cancer.

Background
Previously a social worker, Norman helped found and for ten years managed Henry Morgentaler's  clinic in St. John's.  She ran for political office in Newfoundland and Labrador. In 2004 and 2006, she ran for the House of Commons of Canada, as a candidate of the New Democratic Party in St. John's South—Mount Pearl, but lost to Loyola Hearn of the Conservative Party of Canada. In 2004 and 2006, Norman placed third to Hearn. Norman is currently a small business owner in St. John's.

Openly lesbian, Norman is the partner of social worker, filmmaker, and politician Gerry Rogers.

Filmmaker
Norman's film My Left Breast, documents her partner Gerry Rogers' battle with breast cancer.  The film received multiple awards and won Norman campaign funding from Rosie O'Donnell.  The film also gained Norman's partner Rogers a spot on The Rosie O'Donnell Show in 2001.

Electoral record

See also
 List of female film and television directors
 List of lesbian filmmakers
 List of LGBT-related films directed by women

References 

1964 births
Living people
21st-century Canadian women politicians
Film producers from Newfoundland and Labrador
Canadian women film producers
Lesbian politicians
Canadian LGBT politicians
New Democratic Party candidates for the Canadian House of Commons
Newfoundland and Labrador candidates for Member of Parliament
Women in Newfoundland and Labrador politics
Canadian abortion-rights activists
Activists from Newfoundland and Labrador
People from Gambo, Newfoundland and Labrador
Businesspeople from St. John's, Newfoundland and Labrador
21st-century Canadian LGBT people